Madin may refer to:

Places in Iran
Madin, Bardsir (مدين - Madīn), a village in Kerman Province
Madin, Jiroft (مدين - Madīn), a village in Kerman Province
Madin, Sirjan (مادين - Mādīn), a village in Kerman Province
Madin, Sistan and Baluchestan (مادين - Mādīn), a village in Sistan and Baluchestan Province

Other
Madin (surname)
Ma'din, an educational institution in Kerala, India